The 1999–2000 Campionato Sammarinese di Calcio season was the 15th season since its establishment. It was contested by 16 teams, and S.S. Folgore/Falciano won the championship.

Regular season

Group A

Group B

Results
All teams play twice against the teams within their own group and once against the teams from the other group.

Championship playoffs

First round
S.P. Tre Fiori 3-1 S.S. Virtus
S.P. Cailungo 3-0 A.C. Libertas

Second round
F.C. Domagnano 0-0 (pen 5-4) S.P. Cailungo
S.S. Folgore/Falciano 0-0 (pen 5-3) S.P. Tre Fiori

Third round
S.P. Tre Fiori 2-1 A.C. Libertas
S.S. Virtus 2-2 (pen 5-3) S.P. Cailungo

Semifinals
S.S. Folgore/Falciano 3-1 F.C. Domagnano
S.P. Tre Fiori 1-2 S.S. Virtus

Preliminaryfinal
F.C. Domagnano 1-0 S.S. Virtus

Final
S.S. Folgore/Falciano 3-1 F.C. Domagnano

References
San Marino - List of final tables (RSSSF)

Campionato Sammarinese di Calcio
San Marino
1999–2000 in San Marino football